ISO 31-11:1992 was the part of international standard ISO 31 that defines mathematical signs and symbols for use in physical sciences and technology. It was superseded in 2009 by ISO 80000-2:2009 and subsequently revised in 2019 as ISO-80000-2:2019.

Its definitions include the following:

Mathematical logic

Sets

Miscellaneous signs and symbols

Operations

Functions

Exponential and logarithmic functions

Circular and hyperbolic functions

Complex numbers

Matrices

Coordinate systems

Vectors and tensors

Special functions

See also
 Mathematical symbols
 Mathematical notation

References and notes

Mathematical symbols
Mathematical notation
00031-11